WFPM-LP (99.5 FM) is a low power radio station broadcasting an urban gospel format. Licensed to Battle Creek, Michigan, it first began broadcasting in 2002. WFPM also broadcasts on translators at 103.7 FM in Jackson and 99.9 FM in Albion.

Sources 
Michiguide.com - WFPM-LP History

External links
 

FPM-LP
Gospel radio stations in the United States
Radio stations established in 2002
2002 establishments in Michigan
FPM-LP